The 2015 Women's Oceania Cup was the ninth edition of the women's field hockey tournament. It was held from 21 to 25 October in Stratford.

The tournament served as a qualifier for the 2016 Summer Olympics.

Australia won the tournament for the sixth time, defeating New Zealand 2–1 in penalties after the final finished in a 2–2 draw.

Teams

Results
All times are local (NZDT).

Preliminary round

Pool

Fixtures

Classification

Final

Statistics

Final standings

Goalscorers

References

External links
FIH.com (Women)

Women's Oceania Cup
Oceania Cup
Oceania Cup
International women's field hockey competitions hosted by New Zealand
Oceania Cup
Sport in Stratford, New Zealand